8th AFCA Awards

Best Film: 
Zero Dark Thirty

The 8th Austin Film Critics Association Awards, honoring the best in filmmaking for 2012, were announced on December 18, 2012.

Top 10 Films
 Zero Dark Thirty
 Argo
 Moonrise Kingdom
 Django Unchained
 Cloud Atlas
 Holy Motors
 Beasts of the Southern Wild
 The Master
 Silver Linings Playbook
 Looper

Winners
 Best Film:
 Zero Dark Thirty
 Best Director:
 Paul Thomas Anderson – The Master
 Best Actor:
 Joaquin Phoenix – The Master
 Best Actress:
 Jennifer Lawrence – Silver Linings Playbook
 Best Supporting Actor:
 Christoph Waltz – Django Unchained
 Best Supporting Actress:
 Anne Hathaway – Les Misérables
 Best Original Screenplay:
 Looper – Rian Johnson
 Best Adapted Screenplay:
 Argo – Chris Terrio
 Best Cinematography:
 The Master – Mihai Mălaimare Jr.
 Best Original Score:
 Cloud Atlas – Reinhold Heil, Johnny Klimek, and Tom Tykwer
 Best Foreign Language Film:
 Holy Motors • France
 Best Documentary:
 The Imposter
 Best Animated Feature:
 Wreck-It Ralph
 Best First Film:
 Benh Zeitlin – Beasts of the Southern Wild
 Breakthrough Artist Award:
 Quvenzhané Wallis – Beasts of the Southern Wild
 Austin Film Award:
 Bernie – Richard Linklater
 Special Honorary Award:
 Matthew McConaughey for his exceptional work in four films this year – Bernie, Killer Joe, Magic Mike, and The Paperboy

References

External links
 IMDb page

2012 film awards
2012
2012 in Texas